Esfaranjan (also Romanized as Esfaranjān and Asfarenjān; also known as Esfarjān and Isfaranjān) is a village in Jolgeh Rural District, in the Central District of Golpayegan County, Isfahan Province, Iran. At the 2006 census, its population was 551, in 164 families.

References 

Populated places in Golpayegan County